The Cleveland Patriots were a professional indoor football team based in Warrensville Heights, Ohio. They were member of the American Indoor Football (AIF) league and played their home games at the Multiplex in Warrensville Heights.  They are the third arena/indoor football team to play in the Cleveland area, with the others being the now defunct Cleveland Thunderbolts & Cleveland Gladiators of the Arena Football League.

Front Office
 Brandon Ikard – CEO/Director of Football Operations
 Patrick Smith – Vice President of Operations
 Justin Robertson - Director of Marketing & Public Relations
 Fred Johnson - Director of Player Personnel
 Matt Stasek - Team Physician

Coaching Staff
 Fred Johnson - Head Coach
 Marcus McIntosh - Defensive Coordinator
 David Carr - Special Teams
 Curtis Ashley - Offensive and Defensive Line

References

External links
 Cleveland Patriots official website

Former American Indoor Football teams